The XWA Frontier Sports Championship is a professional wrestling championship contested for in the XWA professional wrestling. Championship reigns are determined by professional wrestling matches, in which competitors are involved in scripted rivalries. These narratives create feuds between the various competitors, which cast them as villains and the heroes.

Tournament
The tournament to crown the inaugural champion was held on 6 December 2015. There was six semi final matches, in which the winners would be moved to the elimination final.

Semi-Finals:
Doug Williams defeated Lord Gideon Grey.
Pastor William Eaver defeated Voodoo.
Jody Fleisch defeated James Castle.
Jonny Storm defeated Paul Tyrrell.
Danny Blaze defeated Richard Parliament.
Rhia O'Reilly vs Pollyanna was declared a no contest after The Congregation (Pastor William Eaver, James Castle and Isaac Zercher) attacked both competitors

Final:
Danny Blaze defeated Doug Williams, Pastor William Eaver, Jody Fleisch and Jonny Storm.

Reigns

See also

Professional wrestling in the United Kingdom

References

External links
 XWA Frontier Sports Championship
Sport in Colchester
XWA (professional wrestling)